Orders Are Orders (German: Befehl ist Befehl) is a 1936 German comedy film directed by Alwin Elling and starring Weiss Ferdl, Trude Hesterberg and Eric Helgar. It was shot at the Halensee Studios in Berlin.

Synopsis
Bavarian Sergeant Josef Murr tries to readjust to civilian life after twelve years serving in the German Army. At first he struggles to settle in various jobs, buy eventually flourishes when he is called upon to impose discipline on the staff of a badly-managed hotel.

Cast
 Weiss Ferdl as 	Josef Murr 
 Trude Hesterberg as 	Alwine Sommer
 Elfriede Sandner as 	Inge
 Eric Helgar as 	Hubert
 Vicky Werckmeister as Mali
 Else Reval as 	Leni
 Oskar Sima as 	Schwanke
 Hubert von Meyerinck as 	Rittmeister von Schlackberg
 Leopold von Ledebur as 	Der Oberst
 Carl Auen as 	Der Hauptmann
 Gerhard Dammann as Hinrichs - Konfektionär
 Kurt Vespermann as 	Hibberlich - Verkäufer
 Hilde Sessak as 	Annerl
 Leo Peukert as 	Hotelportier
 Erich Bartels as 	Chef im Reisebüro
 Anita Düwell as Sekretärin im Reisebüro
 Arthur Reinhardt as Kompaniefeldwebel
 Gaston Briese as Der Dicke bei der Führung
 Herbert Weissbach as Der spleenige Engländer
 Leo Sloma as 	Der Dicke im Konfektionsladen
 Hans Schneider as 	Xaver Murr

References

Bibliography 
 Klaus, Ulrich J. Deutsche Tonfilme: Jahrgang 1936. Klaus-Archiv, 1988.
 Waldman, Harry. Nazi Films In America, 1933-1942. McFarland & Co, 2008.

External links 
 

1936 films
Films of Nazi Germany
1930s German-language films
Films directed by Alwin Elling
1930s German films
German comedy films
1936 comedy films
Films shot at Halensee Studios